Ivo "Ive" Radovniković (9 February 1918 – 27 October 1977) was a Croatian football player and manager.

Playing career
A native of Split, Radovniković joined local powerhouse Hajduk Split in 1930 at the age of 12, and debuted professionally for the club six years later in a match against SK Bata Borovo. In the next 17 years with the club he appeared in a total of 475 matches and scored 160 goals (including 117 appearances and 23 goals in the Yugoslav First League). With the club he won the Banovina of Croatia championship in 1941 and two Yugoslav First League titles in 1950 and 1952.

During World War II when Hajduk was briefly disbanded by the authorities he was one of the players who joined the re-established club in exile on the island of Vis (which was at the time stronghold of the Yugoslav Partisans) and where Hajduk played exhibition matches until the end of the war. He holds the distinction of appearing in 85 matches for the war-time Hajduk squad. Although he was never capped for Yugoslavia, he was member of the Yugoslav squad which competed in the 1950 World Cup in Brazil.

Managerial career
After retiring from football at the end of the 1952–53 season, he became a manager. He returned to Hajduk and managed their youth team from 1955 to 1958, before taking over as manager in the 1958–59 season and finishing seventh in the national championship. After that he had managing stints with several lower level sides, including Sloga Doboj and RNK Split.

References

External links
 
Ivo Radovniković profile at the Hajduk Split website 

1918 births
1977 deaths
Footballers from Split, Croatia
People from the Kingdom of Dalmatia
Association football midfielders
Yugoslav footballers
Croatian footballers
1950 FIFA World Cup players
HNK Hajduk Split players
Yugoslav First League players
Yugoslav football managers
HNK Hajduk Split managers
RNK Split managers
Burials at Lovrinac Cemetery